Warner Wing (September 19, 1805 – March 12, 1876) was an American jurist and legislator.

Born in Marietta, Ohio, Wing moved with his family to Detroit, Michigan Territory, in 1817. Wing studied law at the Northampton Law School in Northampton, Massachusetts. He moved to Monroe, Michigan Territory, in 1828, and practiced law. Wing served in the Michigan House of Representatives in 1837 and then in the Michigan State Senate in 1838 and 1839. Wing served on the Michigan Supreme Court from 1845 to 1856. He then resigned and was general counsel for the Lakeshore and Southern Michigan Railroad until his death. Wing died in Monroe, Michigan.

Notes

1805 births
1876 deaths
Politicians from Marietta, Ohio
People from Monroe, Michigan
Michigan lawyers
Chief Justices of the Michigan Supreme Court
19th-century American judges
Members of the Michigan House of Representatives
Michigan state senators
19th-century American lawyers
19th-century American politicians
Justices of the Michigan Supreme Court